Dumitru Cătălin Beca (born 26 March 1985) is a Romanian rugby union football player. He most recently played as a hooker for professional SuperLiga club Dinamo București.

Club career
During his career, Cătălin Beca played mostly for Dinamo București and for a short period for CSU Aurel Vlaicu, Steaua București and CSM București, all in Romanian SuperLiga.

International career
Beca is also selected for Romania's national team, the Oaks, making his international debut during the 2009 season of European Nations Cup First Division in a test match against the Los Leones.

References

External links

1985 births
Living people
Romanian rugby union players
Romania international rugby union players
București Wolves players
CS Dinamo București (rugby union) players
CSU Aurel Vlaicu Arad players
CSA Steaua București (rugby union) players
CSM București (rugby union) players
Rugby union hookers